Yannis Barnabas Emanuel Philippakis (Greek: Ιωάννης "Γιάννης" Φιλιππάκης) (born 23 April 1986) is a Greek-born singer, songwriter and guitarist. He is a founding member and the lead vocalist of the British indie rock band Foals, with whom he has released seven studio albums since their founding in 2005.

Philippakis occasionally works on separate music projects individually, such as interviews and collaborations.

Early life
Born to a Greek father and a South African Jewish mother, Philippakis lived in Greece until he was 4 years old when his family moved to South Africa. After living there for a year, his parents divorced. Every summer Philippakis would visit his father in Olympos on the Greek island Karpathos. His father played a significant role in his life regarding music, teaching him traditional Greek songs. Philippakis was raised in the Greek Orthodox religion.

Education
Philippakis was educated at Magdalen College School. There, he had met all of the requirements for an assisted place at Magdalen, where he had taken classes on French, literature, and art. While attending school, Philippakis faced many difficulties due to his father's absence; he would get into trouble with the teachers and was ill-tempered. This led to him being suspended twice. Philippakis then went on to study English literature at St John's College, Oxford; he dropped out before completing his degree to focus on the band.

Career

Music

Foals
Philippakis formed Foals in 2005 with friend and former Youthmovies frontman Andrew Mears after the break-up of his former band the Edmund Fitzgerald, which also featured his Foals bandmate, drummer Jack Bevan.

Other musical projects
In a BBC 6 hub session interview, Philippakis expressed his desire to write a 'ballet with beats'.

In 2010, Philippakis appeared and was interviewed in the documentary Anyone Can Play Guitar.

Philippakis produced the track "Wolf" on Trophy Wife's 2011 EP Bruxism.

In January 2018, Philippakis began a monthly club night in south London called MILK. Special guests are kept secret until the night of the performance, making each night different. Every night at MILK is recorded and made available in limited numbers on vinyl for purchase at the following month's event. Philippakis said, "I want to make a club night that me & my friends would want to go to. Where the night acts like a sort of dream collider of different musicians in the hope of the surprising, the life affirming & the downright dirty."

In 2020, Grammy-nominated producer duo, CamelPhat, released "Hypercolour" featuring Philippakis. The Liverpool duo had stated they were "longtime fans of Foals" and "have always been on [their] list to collaborate with" in an interview with Forbes.

A month after the initial release of "Hypercolour", CamelPhat released the official visualizer on their YouTube channel. The video itself is directed by Philippakis alongside Kit Moneith and features Philippakis himself against a backdrop of colourful psychedelic imagery and kaleidoscopic scenes.

Other
He performed as an actor in an adaptation of Marguerite Duras' Moderato Cantabile, directed by Alexander Zeldin.

TV appearances

Individually
 Never Mind the Buzzcocks

With Foals
 EA Sports
 Later... with Jools Holland
 Skins (Released as a MySpace exclusive, then aired by E4)
 The Culture Show
 T-Mobile's Transmission
 The Album Chart Show
 Barclaycard Mercury Prize Sessions
 Live from Abbey Road
 The Late Show with Stephen Colbert
 Austin City Limits' with Alejandro Escovedo & Peter Buck
 Glastonbury Festival BBC 2019 and 2022 Glastonbury Coverage

Albums
 Antidotes (2008)
 Total Life Forever (2010)
 Holy Fire (2013)
 What Went Down (2015)
 Everything Not Saved Will Be Lost – Part 1 (2019)
 Everything Not Saved Will Be Lost – Part 2 (2019)
 Life Is Yours (2022)

References

External links

 
 A Band That Cradles Its Rock, Even Under All Those Layers of Expectations, New York Times
 Music Review: Foals, BBC Norfolk – 2008
Foals reviewed on The Mag
 

1986 births
21st-century Greek male singers
21st-century guitarists
People from the South Aegean
People educated at Magdalen College School, Oxford
Alumni of St John's College, Oxford
Greek emigrants to South Africa
Greek emigrants to the United Kingdom
Greek people of South African descent
Greek people of Ukrainian-Jewish descent
Living people
People from Oxford